The Teteven dialect is a Bulgarian dialect, which is part of the Balkan group of the Eastern Bulgarian dialects. It is spoken in the town of Teteven and several neighbouring villages and is almost completely surrounded by the Central Balkan dialect, except on the west where it borders on the Western Bulgarian Botevgrad dialect.

Phonological and morphological characteristics
 The articulation of yat generally follows the Central Balkan dialect. This brings the Teteven dialect closer to certain Rup dialects: черша vs. formal Bulgarian череша (cherry), мт vs. formal Bulgarian мет (honey)

 Articulation of Old Church Slavonic ѫ (yus) and ъ as broad е in a stressed syllable and as a slightly reduced a in an unstressed syllable, as in the Erkech dialect: зп vs. formal зъп, дажд vs. formal дъждът
  for Old Church Slavonic little yus (ѧ) with palatalisation of the preceding consonant: кл҄етва   vs. formal Bulgarian клетва (oath)
 Transition of a into e only after a soft (palatal) consonant and ч  but not before ж  and ш  (cf. Balkan dialects
 Vocalic r and l for Old Church Slavonic ръ/рь and лъ/ль as in the Northwestern Bulgarian dialects instead of the combinations ръ/ър (~) and лъ/ъл (~) in Standard Bulgarian - дрво, слза instead of дърво, сълза (tree, tear)
 The masculine definite article is broad е in a stressed syllable and as a slightly reduced a in an unstressed syllable: даж'д vs. formal Bulgarian дъж'дът
 Ending e instead of formal Bulgarian i for plural past active aorist participles (биле instead of били), as in the Northwestern Bulgarian dialects
 Ending e instead of formal Bulgarian i for multi-syllable masculine nouns (българе instead of българи)

Most of the other phonological and morphological characteristics of the Erkech dialect are similar to the general features typical for all Balkan dialects, cf. article for details.

Sources
Стойков, Стойко: Българска диалектология, Акад. изд. "Проф. Марин Дринов", 2006

References 

Dialects of the Bulgarian language